Circle D-KC Estates is a census-designated place (CDP) in Bastrop County, Texas, United States. The population was 2,588 at the 2020 census.

Geography
Circle D-KC Estates is located at  (30.159522, -97.236083), about seven miles northeast of Bastrop.

The subdivision was heavily damaged in the 2011 Bastrop County Complex fire.

Demographics

As of the 2020 United States census, there were 2,588 people, 1,003 households, and 684 families residing in the CDP.

As of the census of 2010, there were 2,393 people, 938 households, and 660 families residing in the CDP. The population density was 257,3 people per square mile (99.3/km2). There were 1,037 housing units at an average density of 111.5/sq mi (43.0/km2). The racial makeup of the CDP was 89.1% White, 1.6% African American, 1.0% Native American, 0.1% Asian, 5.4% from other races, and 2.8% from two or more races. Hispanic or Latino of any race were 17.6% of the population.

There were 938 households, out of which 28.7% had children under the age of 18 living with them, 58.4% were married couples living together, 8.4% had a female householder with no husband present, and 29.6% were non-families. 22.2% of all households were made up of individuals, and 8.2% had someone living alone who was 65 years of age or older. The average household size was 2.55 and the average family size was 3.00.

In the CDP, the population was spread out, with 23.3% under the age of 19, 3.6% from 19 to 24, 22.7% from 25 to 44, 37.0% from 45 to 64, and 13.3% who were 65 years of age or older. The median age was 45.2 years. For every 100 females, there were 103.3 males. For every 100 females age 18 and over, there were 102.9 males.

The median income for a household in the CDP was $52,983, and the median income for a family was $60,313. Males had a median income of $40,000 versus $30,595 for females. The per capita income for the CDP was $22,996. None of the families and 1.3% of the population were living below the poverty line, including no under eighteens and none of those over 64.

Education
Circle D-KC Estates is served by the Bastrop Independent School District. Most residents are zoned to Emile Elementary School (former Emile School), while some are zoned to Lost Pines Elementary School. All residents are zoned to Bastrop Intermediate School, Bastrop Middle School, and Bastrop High School.

References

External links
 
 Circle D Area Map - Bastrop County, Texas

Census-designated places in Bastrop County, Texas
Census-designated places in Texas
Census-designated places in Greater Austin